The FIS Nordic Junior and U23 World Ski Championships 2014 took place in Val di Fiemme, Italy from 28 January to 3 February 2014. It was the 37th Junior World Championships and the 9th Under-23 World Championships in nordic skiing.

Medal summary

Junior events

Cross-country skiing

Nordic Combined

Ski jumping

Under-23 events

Cross-country skiing

Medal table

References 

2014
2014 in cross-country skiing
2014 in ski jumping
Junior World Ski Championships
2014 in youth sport
International sports competitions hosted by Italy